Sergio Doplicher (born 30 December 1940) is an Italian mathematical physicist, who mainly dealt with the mathematical foundations of quantum field theory and quantum gravity.

Biography 
Sergio Doplicher graduated in Physics at the Sapienza University of Rome in 1963 under the supervision of Giovanni Jona-Lasinio. From 1976 to 2011 he was full professor of quantum mechanics in the mathematics department of Sapienza University, retiring there in 2011 as professor emeritus.

He is known for his research based on the Haag–Kastler axioms and for his collaboration with Rudolf Haag. With John E. Roberts and Haag, he examined superselection rules in the algebraic quantum field theory, providing the first proof of the spin–statistics theorem entirely based only on first principles. Doplicher and Roberts also proved a reconstruction theorem for the algebra of quantum fields and the compact group of global internal symmetries from the algebra of the observables. In other collaborations, Doplicher studied the local aspects of superselection rules. After introducing the split-property, he derived exact current algebras and a weak form of a quantum Noether theorem.

Later in his career, Doplicher dealt with the mathematical foundations of quantum gravity in terms
of the quantum structure of space-time at the Planck scale. He also addressed the problem of measurement in local quantum physics.

He is author of the first article of the first number of the scientific journal Communications in Mathematical Physics.

Honors and awards 
Doplicher was an Invited Speaker at the International Congress of Mathematicians in Kyoto in 1990. He was awarded in 2004 the Humboldt Prize and in 2011 the Italian National Prize Presidente della Repubblica of the Lincei National Academy. In 2013 he was elected a Fellow of the American Mathematical Society and in 2019 a member of the Academia Europaea.

Selected publications

Scientific

Others

See also 

 Algebraic quantum field theory
 Dagger compact category
 Gauge group
 Local quantum physics
 Noncommutative quantum field theory
 Quantum field theory
 Quantum gravity
 Quantum spacetime
 Superselection

References

External links
 .
 .
 
 
 
 

Mathematical physicists
20th-century Italian physicists
20th-century Italian mathematicians
21st-century Italian mathematicians
Academic staff of the Sapienza University of Rome
Fellows of the American Mathematical Society
Members of Academia Europaea
Humboldt Research Award recipients
1940 births
Living people
21st-century Italian physicists